Jonathan Murray Chu (born November 2, 1979) is an American film director, producer, and screenwriter. He is best known as the director of 2018's Crazy Rich Asians, the first film by a major Hollywood studio to feature a majority cast of Asian descent in a modern setting since The Joy Luck Club in 1993.

The films that he has directed often include musical elements, including the dance films Step Up 2: The Streets (2008) and Step Up 3D (2010), musicals Jem and the Holograms (2015) and In the Heights (2021), and the live concert films Justin Bieber: Never Say Never (2011) and Justin Bieber's Believe (2013). Chu is an alumnus of the USC School of Cinematic Arts.

Early life
Chu was born in Palo Alto, California and grew up in nearby Los Altos. He attended Pinewood School from kindergarten through 12th grade.
Chu is the youngest of five children. He began making movies in fifth grade, when his mother gifted him a video camera to document their family vacations. Chu instead began making home movies starring his siblings.

His mother, Ruth Chu, was born in Taiwan; his father, Lawrence Chu, was born in Sichuan.  His family owns the restaurant called Chef Chu's.

Chu obtained a BFA in Film & Television Production from University of Southern California in 2003. He won the Princess Grace Award, the Kodak Student Filmmaker Award, the Dore Schary Award presented by the Anti-Defamation League, the Jack Nicholson directing award, and was recognized as an honoree for the IFP/West program Project: Involve.

Career 
After making his student short, When the Kids Are Away, Chu was signed to William Morris Agency and attached to several high-profile projects. Chu was hired by Sony Pictures to direct their feature Bye Bye Birdie, but Sony never green lit the film due to budget concerns. Sony re-hired Chu to direct their updated version of The Great Gatsby, which did not pan out as the project was purchased by Warner Bros. Pictures for their 2013 film.

He is in a dance crew called AC/DC or Adam/Chu Dance crew. In an interview, Chu addressed a question he is often asked, "Why do all of your films have dance?" He responded, "I don't know why. It seems so obvious. But there's something about the dancers that motivate me the most. I don't know if it's just dance, but I do think that the dancers are amazing artists, and every time I meet a new dancer, that triggers something in my brain, and I'm more creative than I could ever be. When I feel that creativity burst, I go with it."

In 2013, Chu was awarded the Visionary Award by East West Players (EWP), the longest-running theater of color in the United States, for his contributions to the Asian Pacific American (APA) community. In an online Q&A, Chu revealed that he had attended EWP's productions as a child and was excited "to push boundaries with them in the future."

Chu directed Crazy Rich Asians, which was the highest-grossing film over the August 17, 2018 weekend, earned over $35M at the US box office during its first five days, and garnered a 93% certified fresh rating from Rotten Tomatoes. Within a week of the film's release, Variety reported that a sequel was already in development by Warner Bros. with Chu scheduled to direct. Director Chu is part of Rachel Chu's family in the book, as a distant cousin.

Chu directed In the Heights, based on the Broadway musical of the same name for Warner Bros. Pictures. It was previously set for a June 26, 2020 release, though it was delayed due to the COVID-19 pandemic. The film was released on June 10, 2021.

Upcoming projects 
In October 2020, it was announced that Chu would be directing the pilot for the Disney+ series Willow, based on the film of the same name, with Warwick Davis returning as the title character. The following month, Chu entered talks to direct a live-adaptation of Disney's Lilo & Stitch.

In January 2021, Chu left directorial duties on Willow due to production delays and personal reasons with the birth of his next child. The following month, it was announced that Chu would direct the two-part film adaptation of Wicked for Universal Pictures, with both parts set for December 2024 and 2025 releases.

Chu will direct an adaptation of Dr. Seuss' Oh, The Places You'll Go!, produced by the Warner Animation Group alongside Dr. Seuss Enterprises and Bad Robot Productions, set for a release date of 2027.

In March 2022, it was announced that Chu would be producing (and possibly directing) an animated film based on the children’s modeling compound Play-Doh. It will be produced by Entertainment One and Hasbro.

Personal life
Chu is married to Kristin Hodge. Their daughter, Willow Chu, was born in 2017; she is named after the 1988 fantasy film Willow. Their son, Jonathan Heights Chu, was born in 2019. His middle name comes from the film, In the Heights, which Chu was in the middle of directing at the time.

Filmography

Films

Short films

Documentary films
 Justin Bieber: Never Say Never (2011)
 Justin Bieber's Believe (2013)

Television

References

External links

1979 births
American writers of Chinese descent
Film directors from California
Living people
Skydance Media people
Writers from Palo Alto, California
American film directors of Chinese descent
American male screenwriters
USC School of Cinematic Arts alumni
Screenwriters from California
American people of Taiwanese descent
American people of Chinese descent